Rapide Club Oued Zem is a Moroccan football club currently playing in the Botola. The club is located in the town of Oued Zem. The club finished in first place in the Botola 2 in the 2016–17 season, which led to the promotion to the first division.

Football clubs in Morocco
Sports clubs in Morocco
Association football clubs established in 1926
1926 establishments in Morocco
Khouribga Province